Mount Jizhen is the second highest mountain in Guangzhou, China, with an altitude of , just 35 meters lower than Tiantang Peak.

It bases at the east of Liuxi River National Forest Park. The mountain was named of cockscomb for its summit and subpeak together looks like cockscomb in the distance. This results some people mistakenly used its height as the mountain's elevation.

References

Jizhen
Jizhen